Hells Canyon Wilderness is the name of two distinct component units of the United States National Wilderness Preservation System:

 Hells Canyon Wilderness (Oregon and Idaho)
 Hells Canyon Wilderness (Arizona)